Juan Carlos Morales Hernández (born November 27, 1992, in Mexico City) is a Mexican professional footballer who currently plays for Potros UAEM.

References

External links
 

1992 births
Living people
Mexican footballers
Association football midfielders
Potros UAEM footballers
Ascenso MX players
Liga Premier de México players
Tercera División de México players
Footballers from Mexico City